McCaa is a surname. Notable people with the surname include:

George McCaa (1884–1960), American footballer and coach
John McCaa (born 1954), American television journalist

See also
Michigan Community College Athletic Association (MCCAA)